Richard I. Shikat (11 January 1897 – 3 December 1968) was a German professional wrestler and World Heavyweight Champion who was active in the early portion of the twentieth century. Shikat was considered to be one of the most dangerous 'hookers' (catch wrestlers) of his era and had memorable bouts with Ed "Strangler" Lewis, Wladek Zbyszko, and Jim Londos.

Championships and accomplishments
 Professional Wrestling
World Heavyweight Wrestling Championship (original version)
 National Wrestling Association
World Heavyweight Championship (1 time)
 New York State Athletic Commission
NYSAC World Heavyweight Championship (2 times)
 Championship Wrestling from Florida
NWA Florida Heavyweight Championship (1 time)
Professional Wrestling Hall of Fame and Museum
Class of 2013

References

External links
 
 

1897 births
1968 deaths
People from Tilsit
German male professional wrestlers
German Navy personnel
Professional Wrestling Hall of Fame and Museum
20th-century professional wrestlers
NWA Florida Heavyweight Champions